Jon Kinnally is an American television writer and producer, most notable for his work on the multi-Emmy award and Golden Globe Award nominated TV show Will & Grace.

Life and career
A graduate of the State University of New York at Oswego, Kinnally also appeared as Mitchell in the Will & Grace episode "One Gay at a Time". He wrote for and produced the hit ABC show, Ugly Betty.

Along with fellow producer Tracy Poust, Kinnally began as a writer for the show and later became executive producer.

Kinnally and Poust penned the famous episode "A Chorus Lie" starring Matt Damon as Owen, Jack's heterosexual rival, pretending to be gay to vie for a spot in the Manhattan Gay Men's Chorus.

References

External links
 

State University of New York at Oswego alumni
Year of birth missing (living people)
Living people
American television producers
American television writers
American male television writers